Antoine Roney (born April 1, 1963, Philadelphia, Pennsylvania) is an American tenor saxophonist, brother to trumpeter Wallace Roney.

He attended the Duke Ellington School of the Arts and the Hartt School of Music of the University of Hartford.

His first album, The Traveler, was recorded in 1992 and released by Muse Records. Some of the tracks were with pianist Jacky Terrasson, bassist Dwayne Burno, and drummer Louis Hayes; saxophonist and flautist James Spaulding was added for the other tracks. "After a few years of extensive touring, Roney issued his sophomore recording, Whirling, in 1996."

Discography

As leader
1992: The Traveler (Muse) with James Spaulding, Jacky Terrasson, Dwayne Burno, Louis Hayes
1995: Whirling (Muse) with Ronnie Mathews, Santi Debriano, Nasheet Waits

As sideman
With Cindy Blackman
Telepathy (Muse, 1992 [1994])
With Ricky Ford
Tenor Madness Too! (Muse, 1992)
With Elvin Jones
The Truth: Heard Live at the Blue Note (Half Note, 1999)
With Wallace Roney
Seth Air (Muse, 1991)
Mistérios (Warner Bros., 1994) 
Village (Warner Bros., 1997)
No Room for Argument (Stretch, 2000)
Prototype (HighNote, 2004)
Mystikal (HighNote, 2005)
Jazz (HighNote, 2007)
If Only for One Night (HighNote, 2010)
Home (HighNote, 2012)

References

External links
Official Myspace
Stone Quarry Records

1963 births
Living people
American jazz soprano saxophonists
American jazz tenor saxophonists
American male saxophonists
Muse Records artists
University of Hartford Hartt School alumni
21st-century American saxophonists
21st-century American male musicians
American male jazz musicians